Kosovare Asllani (born 29 July 1989) is a Swedish professional footballer who plays as a striker or an attacking midfielder for Italian first division Serie A club AC Milan and the Sweden national team. Nicknamed "Kosse", Asllani possesses great speed and technique in her game.

Asllani began her club career with Vimmerby IF and has played in the Damallsvenskan for Linköpings FC and hometown club Kristianstads DFF. In the 2010 season she played in the United States, with Chicago Red Stars of Women's Professional Soccer (WPS). She returned to Sweden to play for Kristianstad, before moving to Paris Saint-Germain, Manchester City and then back to Linköping. She currently plays for AC Milan.

Club career

Childhood and early career
Asllani is of Kosovar-Albanian descent, born in Kristianstad to Kosovar parents who had migrated to Sweden. Asllani grew up playing both football and ice hockey, but chose to focus her talents on football. At the age of 15, Asllani started her career at second division team Vimmerby IF. During her time at Vimmerby, she scored 49 goals in 48 matches, establishing herself as a football prodigy. Former coach Cecilia Wilhelmsson praised Asllani's football technique and fitness. After receiving offers from many clubs, Asllani accepted a move to Damallsvenskan team Linköpings FC in 2007, where she made quick progress.

Linköpings FC
During Asllani's first season, she generally came off the substitutes' bench early in the games to help her settle into the Damallsvenskan. During the following season, Asllani established herself as a regular starter and was an increasingly valuable member of the squad. In 2009, she helped Linköping win both the Svenska Cupen and the club's first ever Damallsvenskan title. On 4 December 2009 American Women's Professional Soccer (WPS) club Chicago Red Stars confirmed that they had signed Asllani from Linköpings FC.

Chicago Red Stars
Asllani spent a single season in the WPS. She was established as a fan's favourite and in the 7th week of the season, Asllani received the WPS Player of the Week award after Chicago Red Stars' defeat of FC Gold Pride. After her season with the Red Stars, Asllani returned to Sweden and Linköpings FC.

Return to Linköping
Asllani's presence boosted Linköping, especially in the UEFA Women's Champions League. She scored goals against Sparta Praha and Arsenal. However, her season was disrupted by a thigh injury and she departed Linköping at the end of the campaign.

Kristianstad DFF
In December 2011, she moved back to her hometown Kristianstad to play with Kristianstads DFF who had finished seventh in the previous year's Damallsvenskan.

Paris Saint-Germain

When Asllani had a month left on her contract with Kristianstads she was subject to a transfer bid from Paris Saint-Germain. Although the teams were in dispute over the size of the transfer fee, Asllani flew to Paris and signed a two-year contract in September 2012, after completing a medical. At PSG Asllani was presented to the media by sporting director Leonardo and player Zlatan Ibrahimović, who declared: "If you want to win you need a Swedish striker." Asllani scored 17 goals in her 19 appearances in the 2012–13 Division 1 Féminine, as PSG finished second in the table behind Lyon. On 4 January 2016, Asllani announced on her Instagram account that she had ended her contract with Paris Saint-Germain, where she had played for three-and-a-half years.

Manchester City
On 22 January 2016, English FA WSL club Manchester City revealed that they had signed Asllani to a two-year contract.

Second return to Linköpings FC
On 10 August 2017, it was announced a two and a half-year contract had been agreed for Asllani to return to Linköpings FC. She departed the club by mutual consent on 15 July 2019.

CD Tacón/Real Madrid
After her departure from Linköpings FC, Asllani signs with CD Tacón/Real Madrid on 18 July 2019. Upon Real Madrid's purchase of their license, CD Tacón will operate as Real Madrid's women's team starting from 2020, making Asllani the first Galáctica.
Asllani scored 5 goals in 17 league appearances for Tacón in the prematurely ended 2019–20 Primera Iberdrola season. After the rebrand of the team to Real Madrid CFF, she started the season explosively, scoring 8 goals in the first 8 league appearances despite playing in an unfamiliar out-and-out-striker role.

AC Milan
On 30 June 2022, Asllani joined AC Milan.

International career
In September 2008 Asllani made her debut for the Sweden national team against Romania, and in 2009 she was called up to represent Sweden in UEFA Women's Euro 2009. Asllani was an important member of the national team during the qualification rounds of the 2011 FIFA Women's World Cup but coach Thomas Dennerby controversially did not select her in the squad sent to Germany for the finals. Football pundits, including Pia Sundhage, the Swedish coach of the United States national team, expressed surprise at Asllani's omission.

Dennerby recalled Asllani to the national squad for the 2012 London Olympics.

Asllani played for Sweden at the 2016 Summer Olympics, where the team won a silver medal. She only scored one goal during a penalty shootout against the United States in the quarterfinals, in which Sweden won the shootout 4–3 after being tied 1–1 during extra time.

As of 2017, Asllani had made more than 90 appearances for the Sweden national team.

She scored in the 5–1 win over Thailand at the 2019 Women's World Cup.

Personal life 
Kosovare Asllani is an ethnic Albanian from Kosovo. Her parents moved to Sweden where she was born. Asllani has a tattoo of a black double-headed eagle, symbolising Albania, on her ankle. She also has the words "Stay Strong" tattooed on the inside of her right biceps.

Career statistics 
Scores and results list Sweden's goal tally first, score column indicates score after each Asllani goal.

Honours
Linköpings FC
Damallsvenskan: 2009, 2017
Svenska Supercupen: 2009
Svenska Cupen: 2008, 2009

Manchester City
FA WSL: 2016
FA WSL Continental Cup: 2016

Sweden
Summer Olympics runner-up: 2016, 2020
FIFA Women's World Cup third place: 2019.

Individual
Swedish women's footballer of the year: 2017
Swedish women's midfielder of the year: 2017
Women's Golden Foot: 2022

References

Match reports

External links

Profile at SvFF 

Player French football stats  at statsfootofeminin.fr
Profile at Paris Saint-Germain
Linköping FC profile 

1989 births
Living people
Swedish women's footballers
Swedish expatriate footballers
Swedish people of Kosovan descent
Swedish people of Albanian descent
Sweden women's international footballers
Expatriate women's soccer players in the United States
Footballers at the 2012 Summer Olympics
Footballers at the 2016 Summer Olympics
Olympic footballers of Sweden
Damallsvenskan players
Linköpings FC players
Kristianstads DFF players
Expatriate women's footballers in France
Swedish expatriate sportspeople in France
Expatriate women's footballers in England
Swedish expatriate sportspeople in England
Swedish expatriate sportspeople in Spain
Expatriate women's footballers in Spain
Expatriate women's footballers in Italy
Swedish expatriate sportspeople in Italy
Paris Saint-Germain Féminine players
People from Kristianstad Municipality
2015 FIFA Women's World Cup players
Women's association football forwards
Women's Super League players
Manchester City W.F.C. players
Medalists at the 2016 Summer Olympics
Olympic silver medalists for Sweden
Olympic medalists in football
Vimmerby IF players
FIFA Century Club
Division 1 Féminine players
2019 FIFA Women's World Cup players
Real Madrid Femenino players
A.C. Milan Women players
Serie A (women's football) players
Footballers at the 2020 Summer Olympics
Medalists at the 2020 Summer Olympics
Women's Professional Soccer players
Sportspeople from Skåne County
UEFA Women's Euro 2022 players
UEFA Women's Euro 2017 players